Quirky: The Remarkable Story of the Traits, Foibles, and Genius of Breakthrough Innovators Who Changed the World is a 2018 book by Melissa Schilling, a professor at New York University Stern School of Business. The book was published by PublicAffairs, a division of Hachette Book Group.

Content

Melissa Schilling develops cases studies of eight serial breakthrough innovators – Elon Musk, Dean Kamen, Steve Jobs, Marie Curie, Albert Einstein, Thomas Edison, Benjamin Franklin, and Nikola Tesla – to identify commonalities in their capabilities, motives, personalities, and experiences. These characteristics are then integrated with the research on innovation and creativity to show how they might influence breakthrough idea generation and extreme persistence.

Reception

The Financial Times reviewer wrote,

Joe Culley at The Irish Times writes, "Schilling's prose is clear and largely jargon-free, and the individual profiles are excellent."

A reviewer in Strategy + Business writes,

In Innovation & Tech Today, Charles Warner writes,

Stephanie Orellana writes,

A reviewer in the International Journal of Innovation Management writes,

References

2018 non-fiction books
Books about businesspeople
Books about Albert Einstein
Books about Nikola Tesla
Books about scientists
PublicAffairs books